Cash for gold may refer to:

 Gold jewelry recycling, a service buying old, broken, or mismatched gold jewelry by local or online gold buyers; see 
 "Cash for Gold" (South Park), an episode of the American animated sitcom South Park
 Cash4Gold, a mail-in refinery that buys gold, silver and platinum primarily from jewelry